People with the surname Bromberg include:
Adam Bromberg (1912–1993), Polish publisher
Andrew Bromberg, Aedas architect
Andy Bromberg, political news analysis platform Sidewire founder
Avraham Bromberg, American Rabbi and Talmudic scholar
Betzy Bromberg, American director, editor, and experimental filmmaker
Brian Bromberg (born 1960), American bassist and record producer
Bruce Bromberg (born 1941), American Grammy Award winning producer of blues music
Conrad Bromberg, Killer Instinct, Silent Witness writer and producer 
David Bromberg (born 1945), American guitarist
Deacon "Deke" Bromberg, character in 2 Broke Girls
Ellen Bromberg, American dance scholar
Faith Bromberg (1919–1990), American painter active within the feminist art movement
Frederick Bromberg, Bromberg's jewelry founder
Frederick George Bromberg (1837-1930), American politician
Gidon Bromberg (born 1963), Israeli director of EcoPeace Middle East
Howard B. Bromberg, United States Army lieutenant general
J. Edward Bromberg (1903-1951), Hungarian-American actor
Konstantin Bromberg (1939-2020), film director 
Manuel Bromberg (born 1917), American artist and Professor of Art
Moshe Bromberg (1920-1982), Polish-Jewish artist and sculptor
Mordy Bromberg (born 1959), Australian football player
Nick Bromberg, sports columnist and author
Philip Bromberg, American psychologist and psychoanalyst
Piet Bromberg (1917-2001), Dutch field hockey player
Samantha Bromberg (born 1995), American diver (also known as Murphy Bromberg)
 (born 1961), French film director 
Stacy Bromberg (1956–2017), American darts player